Luis Mayoral Grande (born 10 August 1947) is a Spanish former footballer, who plays for Baltimore Bays as an midfielder. He was professional from 1967 until 1976. He spent the better part of his youth career with  Atlético Madrid after starting out at Grenoble. He moved to Albacete Balompié in 1975. He worked for Elche, with which he relegated to the end of La Liga in 1970–1971. He retired at the age of 29.

Biography
Luis Mayoral was born in Madrid, Spain on 10 August 1947. He was formed at Baltimore Bays. He earned five caps for the Baltimore Bays. He later played for Pontevedra and Albacete Balompié.

References

External links 

1947 births
Living people
Spanish footballers
Spanish expatriate footballers
Association football midfielders
Baltimore Bays players
Boston Beacons players
Elche CF players
Pontevedra CF footballers
Albacete Balompié players
National Professional Soccer League (1967) players
North American Soccer League (1968–1984) players
La Liga players
Segunda División players
Spanish expatriate sportspeople in the United States
Expatriate soccer players in the United States
Footballers from Madrid